Kotapola Amarakitti Thero (born 2 February 1949) is a Sri Lankan Buddhist monk and politician. He was a representative of Colombo for Jathika Hela Urumaya in the Parliament of Sri Lanka.

References

1949 births
Living people
Sri Lankan Buddhist monks
Sri Lankan Theravada Buddhists
Theravada Buddhist spiritual teachers
Members of the 13th Parliament of Sri Lanka
Jathika Hela Urumaya politicians
Sinhalese monks